Žarko Đurović (born 1 August 1961) is a Serbian football manager and former player.

Playing career
Đurović spent most of his playing career at Red Star Belgrade, winning two Yugoslav First League titles (1984 and 1988). He also played abroad for Swiss club Bellinzona, before retiring from the game.

Managerial career
In December 2010, Đurović was named as assistant manager to Robert Prosinečki at Red Star Belgrade. He left the position in June 2012. In 2013, Đurović briefly served as manager of Radnik Surdulica.

References

Honours
Red Star Belgrade
 Yugoslav First League: 1983–84, 1987–88
 Yugoslav Cup: 1981–82

External links
 
 

1961 births
Living people
Footballers from Belgrade
Association football midfielders
Yugoslav footballers
Serbian footballers
FK Čukarički players
Red Star Belgrade footballers
FK Sutjeska Nikšić players
AC Bellinzona players
Yugoslav Second League players
Yugoslav First League players
Yugoslav expatriate footballers
Expatriate footballers in Switzerland
Yugoslav expatriate sportspeople in Switzerland
Serbia and Montenegro football managers
Serbian football managers
FK Borac Čačak managers
FC VSS Košice managers
Red Star Belgrade non-playing staff
FK Radnik Surdulica managers
Guangzhou City F.C. non-playing staff
Serbian SuperLiga managers
Serbian expatriate football managers
Expatriate football managers in Slovakia
Expatriate football managers in China
Serbian expatriate sportspeople in Slovakia
Serbian expatriate sportspeople in China